Warwickshire 1 was a tier 9 English Rugby Union league with teams from Warwickshire taking part.  Promoted teams moved up to Midlands 4 West (South) and relegated sides dropped to Warwickshire 2.  Warwickshire 1 was cancelled at the end of the 2005–06 season with the majority of teams transferred into the newly introduced Midlands 5 West (South).

Original teams

When league rugby began in 1987 this division contained the following teams:

Atherstone
Broadstreet
Coventry Welsh
Dunlop
GEC Coventry
Keresley
Old Coventrians
Old Laurentians
Old Wheatleyans
Rugby St Andrews
Trinity Guild

Warwickshire 1 honours

Warwickshire 1 (1987–1992)

The original Warwickshire 1 was a tier 8 league with promotion up to Staffordshire/Warwickshire and relegation to Warwickshire 2.  At the end of the 1991–92 season the merging of all Staffordshire and Warwickshire leagues meant that Warwickshire 1 was discontinued for the years that these leagues were active.

Warwickshire (1996–2000)

Restructuring of the Staffordshire/Warwickshire leagues ahead of the 1996–97 season saw the reintroduction of a single Warwickshire league, which along with its counterpart Staffordshire was a tier 9 league.  Promotion was to Staffordshire/Warwickshire 1 and there was no relegation until the reintroduction of Warwickshire 2 at the end of the 1999–00 season.

Warwickshire 1 (2000–2006)

The cancellation of Staffordshire/Warwickshire 1 would see Warwickshire become Warwickshire 1, remaining as a tier 9 league.  Promotion was to Midlands 4 West (South) and relegation to Warwickshire 2 until that division was cancelled at the end of the 2003–04 season.  At the end of the 2005–06 season Warwickshire 1 was cancelled and all teams transferred to the newly introduced Midlands 5 West (South) and Midlands 6 West (South-East) divisions.

Number of league titles

Harbury (2)
Atherstone (1)
Broadstreet (1)
Claverdon (1)
Coventry Welsh (1)
Earlsdon (1)
Kenilworth (1)
Keresley (1)
Manor Park (1)
Marconi (1)
Old Laurentians (1)
Rugby St Andrews (1)
Spartans (Midlands) (1)
Trinity Guild (1)

See also
Warwickshire 2
Warwickshire 3
Midlands RFU
Warwickshire RFU
English rugby union system
Rugby union in England

Notes

References

9
Rugby union in Warwickshire